Orange Compile -Daidai no Noudou Hensekishiki- (Orange Compile -橙の能動編積式-), also known as Quantum Mechanics Rainbow VI: Orange Compile, is the eleventh solo album from Japanese musician Daisuke Asakura released on December 31, 2004. The album is the sixth in the Quantum Mechanics Rainbow series. The concept of this series is "one album for every rainbow color and a different Quantum Mechanics term".

Track listing

All songs produced, composed and arranged by Daisuke Asakura.

References
 Official Daisuke Asakura Profile
 Daisuke Asakura Discography on Sony Music Japan

2004 albums
Daisuke Asakura albums